Kurtkowiec is an oligotrophic lake part of the Gąsienicowe Ponds, located in the Tatra Mountains in Poland.

References

Lakes of Poland
Lakes of Lesser Poland Voivodeship
Lakes of the High Tatras